General elections were held in Vanuatu on 30 October 2012. The previous elections to the 52-member Parliament of Vanuatu were held in 2008. The largest parties in this election were the socialist Vanua'aku Party, which won 11 seats, and the social-democratic National United Party (8 seats).  Thirteen other parties as well as four independents won parliamentary seats.  As a result, Edward Natapei of the Vanua'aku Party was able to become the Prime Minister.  Since then, both Serge Vohor of the conservative Union of Moderate Parties and Sato Kilman of the People's Progressive Party have held that position, with Kilman being the incumbent Prime Minister of Vanuatu at the time of the 2012 election.

Electoral system
The 52 members of Parliament will be elected in 17 multi-member constituencies, using the single non-transferable vote.

Candidates had to be at least 25 years old, and could not have an undischarged prison sentence or bankruptcy. They also required the support of at least five registered voters in their constituency, and had to put down a non-refundable 50,000 vatu deposit. The President, judges, magistrates, civil servants, police officers, teachers and members of the National Council of Chiefs were all ineligible for election to Parliament.

Campaign
346 candidates from 32 political parties contested the 52 seats.

There were 344 polling stations throughout the country, including 12 in the capital city, Port Vila. Over 192,000 citizens were eligible to vote in the 2012 election, with 34,998 registered voters in the capital city.

The election was being observed by representatives from Australia, China, the European Union and the United States, as well as the High Commissioner of New Zealand to Vanuatu, Bill Dobie. The international observers will submit a report on the election to the Vanuatuan government once the election is completed.

Conduct
Following the election, Attorney General Ishmael Kalsakau alleged that three ministers, including Moana Carcasses Kalosil, engaged in vote buying to secure several seats in Port Vila.

Results

Subsequent by-elections
2013 Tanna by-election, following the death of Harry Iauko, Iauko Group MP for Tanna. By-election won by his son Pascal Iauko (Iauko Group)
2015 Port-Vila by-election, following the death of Edward Natapei, Vanua'aku Pati MP for Port-Vila. The by-election was won by Kenneth Natapei for the Vanua'aku Pati.

See also
List of members of the Parliament of Vanuatu (2012–2016)

References

Elections in Vanuatu
Vanuatu
General
Vanuatu